The Millar-Wheeler House is a historic home located at 1423 Genesee Street in Utica, Oneida County, New York.  It was built in 1866, and consists of a three-story, square, brick main block and two-story, frame rear wing.  It features an ornate Italianate style entrance portico topped by an oriel window, a low-pitched hipped roof with broad eaves and belvedere, and scrolled brackets.  It is operated as Rosemont Inn, a bed and breakfast.

It was listed on the National Register of Historic Places in 2000.

References

External links
History of the home, at Rosemont Inn  Bed and Breakfast

Houses on the National Register of Historic Places in New York (state)
Italianate architecture in New York (state)
Houses completed in 1866
Bed and breakfasts in New York (state)
Houses in Oneida County, New York
National Register of Historic Places in Oneida County, New York